Rheinland Nature Park (Naturpark Rheinland) is a nature park in North Rhine-Westphalia, situated between Bergheim, Kerpen, Erftstadt, Euskirchen, Königswinter, Bornheim, Bonn, Brühl, Hürth, Frechen and Pulheim. It covers an area of about 880 km2.

Ville-Seen-Platte 
Roughly translated, this would be the 'plateau of lakes in the Ville'.

In the vicinity of Erftstadt, Brühl and Hürth many small and large lakes have been created due to coal mining. The reforestation of the area was begun in 1920 by planting beech, pine, oak and larch trees. Today, there are about forty lakes that have sprung from the mining operations.

List of lakes on the Villen-Seen-Platte:

 Concordia See
 Köttinger See
 Zieselsmaarsee
 Villesee
 Dinnendahlsee
 Liblarer See
 Forellenteich
 Obersee
 Mittelsee
 Untersee
 Bleibtreusee
 Silbersee
 Heider Bergsee
 Gruhlsee
 Margarethenweier
 Schluchtsee
 Franziskussee
 Karauschenweiher
 Teich
 Donatussee
 Zwillingssee
 Entenweiher
 Villenhofer Maar
 Pfingsdorfer See
 Fasanenweiher
 Forsthausweiher
 Lucretiasee
 Berggeistsee
 Gotteshülfeteich
 Otto-Maiglersee
 Waldsee
 Klärteich

External links 

 Naturpark Rheinland (German)

Nature parks in North Rhine-Westphalia
Rhineland